Abraham Obaretin is a Nigerian Paralympic powerlifter. He represented Nigeria at the 1996 Summer Paralympics held in Atlanta, United States and at the 2000 Summer Paralympics held in Sydney, Australia. He won the silver medal in the men's 48 kg event in 1996.

References

External links 
 

Living people
Year of birth missing (living people)
Place of birth missing (living people)
Powerlifters at the 1996 Summer Paralympics
Powerlifters at the 2000 Summer Paralympics
Medalists at the 1996 Summer Paralympics
Paralympic silver medalists for Nigeria
Paralympic medalists in powerlifting
Paralympic powerlifters of Nigeria
Nigerian powerlifters
20th-century Nigerian people